These are the  results of the 2018 Asian Indoor Athletics Championships which took place between 1 and 3 February 2018 in Tehran, Iran.

Men's results

60 meters

Heats – 1 February

Final – 1 February

400 meters

Heats – 1 February

Final – 2 February

800 meters

Heats – 1 February

Final – 2 February

1500 meters
3 February

3000 meters
1 February

60 meters hurdles

Heats – 2 February

Final – 3 February

4 × 400 meters relay
3 February

High jump
1 February

Pole vault
2 February

Long jump

Heats – 1 February

Final – 3 February

Triple jump
3 February

Shot put
2 February

Heptathlon
1–2 February

Women's results

60 meters

Heats – 1 February

Final – 2 February

400 meters

Heats – 1 February

Final – 2 February

800 meters
1 February

1500 meters
3 February

3000 meters
1 February

60 meters hurdles
2 February

4 × 400 meters relay
3 February

High jump
1 February

Pole vault
2 February

Long jump
3 February

Triple jump
1 February

Shot put
2 February

Pentathlon
3 February

References

Asian Indoor Championships Results
Events at the Asian Indoor Athletics Championships